Šmrika  is a village in Croatia, near the Island Krk and the Krk Bridge. It's part of the Town of Kraljevica, which is part of the Primorje-Gorski Kotar County.

Populated places in Primorje-Gorski Kotar County